Dr. Babasaheb Ambedkar Open University is a public institution of higher learning in Ahmedabad, Gujarat, India. It provides a variety of certificate courses, Diploma and degree programs through distance education mode, and other flexible mediums for its students. It is named after Indian political leader and the architect of the Indian Constitution Dr. Babasaheb Ambedkar.

Profile
The new concept of open education came into existence with the establishment of the Indira Gandhi National Open University. The university offers 38 programmes.

Structure

Programmes 

 Post Graduate Programmes
 Graduate Programmes
 Post Graduate Diploma Programmes
 Diploma Programmes
 Certificate Programmes
 Ph.D. and M.Phil Programmes

Centres

 Centre for Internal Quality Assurance 
 Centre for Electronic Media Production - Chaitanya Studio
 Centre for Examination and Evaluation

 Centre for Electronic Data Processing  - Computer Department
 Centre for Research and Developmeent
 Centre for Online Education
 Centre for Skill Development andVocational Training
 Centre for Equal Opportunities and Inclusive Education
 Centre for Innovation, Start-up and Entrepreneurship
 Centre for Holistic Development of Women

Cells 
Grievance Redressal programme
Scheduled Caste/Scheduled Tribe Cell
Students Cell
Sexual Harassment Cell
Statistical Cell
Single Window Cell
Women Development Cell

Schools
School of Humanities & Social Sciences
School of Commerce and Management
School of Education Distance Education & Education Technology
School of Computer Science

External links
Website of Dr. Babasaheb Ambedkar Open University

Open universities in India
Dr. Babasaheb Ambedkar Open University
Universities and colleges in Ahmedabad
1994 establishments in Gujarat
Educational institutions established in 1994